Borisinh is a village in Yavatmal district in the Indian state of Maharashtra. Its population at the 2011 Census of India was 1,539.

References

Cities and towns in Yavatmal district